Gregory O'Brian Brathwaite (born 9 December 1969) is a cricket umpire from Barbados. He stood in his first One Day International (ODI) match on 7 August 2011, between Canada and Afghanistan in the 2011–13 ICC World Cricket League Championship. He stood in his first Twenty20 International (T20I) match on 27 March 2012, between the West Indies and Australia.

He is a member of the International Cricket Council (ICC) International Panel of Umpires and Referees representing the West Indies.

In January 2018, he was named as one of the seventeen on-field umpires for the 2018 Under-19 Cricket World Cup. In October 2018, he was named as one of the twelve on-field umpires for the 2018 ICC Women's World Twenty20. In February 2020, the ICC named him as one of the umpires to officiate in matches during the 2020 ICC Women's T20 World Cup in Australia.

In March 2021, in the series between the West Indies and Sri Lanka, Brathwaite stood in his first Test as an umpire.

See also
 List of Test cricket umpires
 List of One Day International cricket umpires
 List of Twenty20 International cricket umpires

References

1969 births
Living people
Barbadian cricket umpires
West Indian Test cricket umpires
West Indian One Day International cricket umpires
West Indian Twenty20 International cricket umpires
People from Saint Philip, Barbados